Poles in Germany are the second largest Polish diaspora (Polonia) in the world and the biggest in Europe. Estimates of the number of Poles living in Germany vary from 2 million to about 3 million people living that might be of Polish descent. Their number has quickly decreased over the years, and according to the latest census, there are approximately 866.690 Poles in Germany. The main Polonia organisations in Germany are the Union of Poles in Germany and Congress of Polonia in Germany. Polish surnames are relatively common in Germany, especially in the Ruhr area (Ruhr Poles).

History 

Since the Partitions of Poland in 1772, 1793 and 1795 and Poland's partial incorporation into Prussia, a large Polish ethnic group existed inside Prussia's borders, especially in the new provinces of Posen and West Prussia. Poles also settled in present-day Germany during the 18th century e.g. in Dresden and Leipzig. Dresden was named Royal-Polish Residential City after Augustus II the Strong became King of Poland in 1697.

During the late 19th century rapid industrialisation in the Ruhr region attracted about 300,000 Poles, especially from East Prussia, West Prussia, Poznań, and Silesia. They comprised about 30% of the Ruhr area population by 1910. Kashubians and Masurians also came. Participants in this migration are called the Ruhr Poles.

After 1870, the Poles were under an increasing pressure of Germanisation, and the Kulturkampf attacked their Catholic Church. Most Catholic bishops were imprisoned or exiled. The teaching language which had previously been Polish in the predominantly Polish-speaking areas in Prussia was replaced by German as teaching language, even in religious education where Polish priests were replaced by German teachers. However, these Germanisation policies were not at all successful. In contrast, it led to the political awakening of many Poles and to the establishment of a wealth of Polish economic, political and cultural associations which were aimed at preserving Polish culture and Polish interests, especially in the Province of Posen and in the Ruhr area. The policy of forced cultural Germanisation alienated large parts of the Polish-speaking population against the German authorities and produced nationalistic sentiments on both sides.

After the First World War, the predominantly Polish provinces had to be ceded to the newly created Polish Republic. Polish-speaking minorities remained especially in Upper Silesia and parts of East Prussia. During the 1922 to 1937 term of the German-Polish Accord on Upper Silesia (Geneva Agreement), signed in Geneva on 15 May 1922, German nationals of Polish ethnicity in Upper Silesia had judicial status as a national minority under the auspices of the League of Nations (likewise the Poles of German ethnicity in the Polish Silesian Voivodeship). After the rise of the Nazis, all Polish activities were systematically constrained, since mid-1937 also in Upper Silesia. However, in August 1939, the leadership of the Polish community was arrested and interned in the Nazi concentration camps of Sachsenhausen and Buchenwald. On 7 September 1939, shortly after the outbreak of World War II, the Nazi government of the Third Reich stripped the Polish community in Germany of its minority status. This was formally confirmed by Hermann Göring's decree of 27 February 1940.

Today

Today the German government does not recognise German nationals of Polish ethnicity as a national minority. As a result, according to Polish agencies, Germany is not recognising the right of self-determination of the Polish minority in Germany. After Poland joined the European Union, several organisations of Poles in Germany attempted to restore the pre-war official minority status, particularly claiming that the Nazi decree is void. While the initial memorandum to the Bundestag remained unanswered, in December 2009 the Minority Commission of the Council of Europe obliged the German government to formally respond to the demands within four months.

The position of the German government is that after the German territorial losses after World War II, the current Polish minority has no century-old roots in the remaining German territory, because Germany lost all the territories where people of German and Polish ethnicity overlapped. Since they are therefore only recent immigrants, they do not fulfill the requirements of a national minority according to the Framework Convention for the Protection of National Minorities and the Treaty of Good Neighbourship. Being German citizens, they still retain all civil and political rights every German citizen possesses, and therefore can voice their will in the political system.

About 10,000 Polish citizens have recently moved to German localities along the Polish-German border, depopulated after the unification of Germany.

Population distribution 

Data of 2011:

Image gallery

Notable individuals

See also 
 
 Germany–Poland relations
 German minority in Poland
 Union of Poles in Germany
 List of notable Germans of Polish origin
 Association of National Minorities in Germany

References

Further reading
 Cyganski, Miroslaw. "Nazi Persecutions of Polish National Minorities in the Rhineland-Westphalia Provinces in the Years 1933–1945," Polish Western Affairs (1976) 17#12 pp 115–138
 Fink, Carole. " Stresemann's Minority Policies, 1924–29," Journal of Contemporary History (1979) 14#3 pp. 403–422 in JSTOR
  Kulczycki, John J. School Strikes in Prussian Poland 1901–1907: The Struggle over Bilingual Education (1981) 
  Kulczycki, John J.  The Polish Coal Miners' Union and the German Labor Movement in the Ruhr, 1902–1934: National and Social Solidarity (1997) 
  Kulczycki, John J. The Foreign Worker and the German Labor Movement: Xenophobia and Solidarity in the Coal Fields of the Ruhr, 1871–1914 (1994)
 Riekhoff, Harald von. German-Polish Relations, 1918–1933 (1971). 
  Sobczak, Janusz. "The Centenary of Polish Emigration To Rhineland-Westphalia," Polish Western Affairs (1970) 11#1 pp 193–198. 
 Wynot, Edward D. "The Poles in Germany, 1919-139," East European Quarterly, 1996 30#2 pp 171+ online broad overview

External links 
 Polonia in Germany
 Web site of Polish community in Germany
 Andrzej Kaluza, Zuwanderer aus Polen in Deutschland
 Sebastian Nagel, Zwischen zwei Welten – Kulturelle Strukturen der polnischsprachigen Bevölkerung in Deutschland Analyse und Empfehlungen